Ectropina is a genus of moths in the family Gracillariidae.

Species
Ectropina acidula (Meyrick, 1911)
Ectropina citricula (Meyrick, 1912) 
Ectropina ligata (Meyrick, 1912) 
Ectropina raychaudhurii Kumata, 1979 
Ectropina sclerochitoni Vári, 1961 
Ectropina suttoni (Bland, 1980)

External links
Global Taxonomic Database of Gracillariidae (Lepidoptera)

Gracillariinae
Gracillarioidea genera